The 2006 Hounslow Council election took place on 4 May 2006 to elect members of Hounslow London Borough Council in London, England. The whole council was up for election and the Labour Party lost control of the council, but remained the largest party. Meanwhile, the Conservatives gained 8 seats from Labour, with the Community Group gaining 3 seats and Hounslow Independent Alliance gaining 2.

Election result

|}

Ward results

Bedfont

Brentford

Chiswick Homefields

Chiswick Riverside

Cranford

Feltham North

Feltham West

Hanworth

Hanworth Park

Heston Central

Heston East

Heston West

Hounslow Central

Hounslow Heath

Hounslow South

Hounslow West

Isleworth

Osterley and Spring Grove

Syon

Turnham Green

References

2006
2006 London Borough council elections